Racing Club de Strasbourg Alsace (commonly known as RC Strasbourg, Racing Straßburg, RCSA, RCS, or simply Strasbourg; Alsatian: Füeßbàllmànnschàft Vu Stroßburri) is a French association football club founded in 1906, based in the city of Strasbourg, Alsace. It has possessed professional status since 1933 and is currently playing in Ligue 1, the top tier of French football, ever since winning the 2016–17 Ligue 2 championship. This comes after the club was demoted to the fifth tier of French football at the conclusion of the 2010–11 Championnat National season after going into financial liquidation. Renamed RC Strasbourg Alsace, they won the CFA championship in 2012–13, and eventually became Championnat National champions in 2015–16. The club's home stadium, since 1914, is the Stade de la Meinau.

The club is one of six clubs to have won all three major French trophies: the Championship in 1979, the Coupe de France in 1951, 1966 and 2001 and the Coupe de la Ligue in 1964, 1997, 2005 and 2019. Strasbourg is also among the six teams to have played more than 2,000 games in France's top flight (spanning 56 seasons) and has taken part in 52 European games since 1961. Despite these accomplishments, the club has never really managed to establish itself as one of France's leading clubs, experiencing relegation at least once a decade since the early 1950s. Racing has changed its manager 52 times in 75 years of professional play, often under pressure from the fans.

The destiny of the club has always been wedded to the history of Alsace. Like the region, Racing has changed nationality three times and has a troubled history. Founded in what was then a part of the German Empire, the club from the beginning insisted on its Alsatian and popular roots, in opposition to the first Strasbourg-based clubs which came from the German-born bourgeoisie. When Alsace was returned to France in 1919, the club changed its name from "1. FC Neudorf" to the current "Racing Club de Strasbourg" in imitation of Pierre de Coubertin's Racing Club de France, a clear gesture of francophilia. Racing players lived through World War II as most Alsatians did: evacuated in 1939, annexed in 1940 and striving to avoid nazification and incorporation in the Wehrmacht between 1942 and 1944. When Alsace was definitively returned to France, Racing's identity switched towards Jacobinism with, for example, emotional wins in the cup in 1951 and 1966 amidst Franco-Alsatian controversies. More recently, the club has been eager to promote its European vocation along with its strong local ties.

In April 2021, the club partnered up with French Esport organization Team Vitality for the FIFA eLigui 1, marking their first step into competitive Esports.

History

Foundation and early years (1906–1945)
The club was founded in 1906 by a group of youngsters in the Neudorf neighbourhood of what was then Straßburg, Elsaß-Lothringen, in the German Empire, but is today Strasbourg, Alsace, in France. With the help of their primary-school teacher, they formed a team called "Erster Fußball Club Neudorf", commonly named "FC Neudorf". At that time, the new 1. FCN was a minor club in a then-remote southern part of the Strasbourg area. Local football had been dominated since the 1890s by the more central and elitist Straßburger Fußball Verein. According to club historian Pierre Perny, the official establishment of the FC Neudorf in 1907 may well have been accelerated by the planned move of FC Frankonia to the Haemmerle Garten, a large park in southern Strasbourg close to the Neudorf. As its name told, FC Frankonia was mainly composed of German-born immigrants from the Franconia region of southwest Germany – some of them soldiers – living in central and northern Strasbourg, while FC Neudorf had clearly Alsatian, popular roots. FC Neudorf joined the southern German league in 1909, starting at its lowest level, Division C. They captured the Division C championship three years later, earning promotion to Division B.  In 1914, FC Neudorf was able to evict rivals Frankonia from the Haemmerle Garten for a rent of 300 marks a year. This location would later become the site of the Stade de la Meinau, where the club still plays today. In the aftermath of World War I, the territory of Alsace-Lorraine came back to France and, on 11 January 1919, the club adopted the name "Racing-Club Strasbourg-Neudorf" until becoming simply "Racing Club de Strasbourg" later in the year. The use of the word "Racing" does not denote any association with horse- or car-racing; instead, it is an anglicism that was common in France at the time, as exemplified by the case of the then-famous Racing Club de France, which was a symbolical inspiration for Strasbourg's Racing as Alsace was reintegrated within France. The word is usually pronounced in French ("Le Racing") or in Alsatian ("D'Racing") without any English accentuation.  Racing quickly joined French competitions and won the Alsace championship in 1923, 1924 and 1927. They also took part in the Coupe de France, the only national competition at that time. In 1925, they reached the last sixteen, where they fell to Lille after eliminating the then-dominant Red Star Paris.

On 10 June 1933, at the "Restaurant de la Bourse", the club made the jump to the professional ranks and, thus, joined the national championship established just a year before. RCS started competition in Ligue 2 but immediately earned promotion to the top flight at the end of the 1933–34 season, going through a pair of two-legged playoff matches, first against Mulhouse (0–0 and 3–1), and then against AS Saint-Étienne (2–0 and 4–4). In the mid-1930s, Racing managed a second-place finish in 1934–35 and a third-place finish the next season. In 1937, the club reached for the first time the final of the Coupe de France, losing to rivals Sochaux (1–2). This successful RCS team of the 1930s included two French internationals – Fritz Keller and Oscar Heisserer – as well as German striker Oskar Rohr who still holds the club's goalscoring record.

With the outbreak of World War II, professional sport was suspended and Alsatians were evacuated to south-west France, especially in the Dordogne. During the Phoney War, a group of youngsters kept the club existing in Périgueux, where they won the Dordogne championship in 1940. RCS captured their group in 1941 and participated in the regional finals, where they were put out by FC Mülhausen. The team earned second-place results in each of the following two seasons and made an appearance in the opening round of the DFB-Pokal in 1942. Starting in 1942, Alsatians were forcibly conscripted in the Wehrmacht and the Waffen-SS and several club players – including Oscar Heisserer – fled or had their teammates deliberately wound them to avoid incorporation. Oskar Rohr also had been imprisoned since 1940 after serving in the French Foreign Legion at the outbreak of the war. During a game against SS side "SG SS Straßburg", Rasensportclub players wore a uniform consisting of a blue jersey, white shorts and red socks as a clear display of French patriotism.

First national successes and failures (1945–1976)
Allied armies retook Alsace in 1944 and the club quickly resumed play as "Racing Club de Strasbourg" in France's top flight. The team was then built around Oscar Heisserer—who became in April 1945 the first Alsatian to captain the national team—and Spanish defender Paco Mateo. In 1947, the Strasbourgeois reached for the second time the final of the cup at Colombes, this time losing to Lille OSC 0–2. They remained in first-division competition until, at the end of the 1948–49 season, it appeared the side would be relegated. However, neighbouring club SR Colmar liquidated their professional team, leaving room for Strasbourg to stay up. In 1951, the Bleus won their first major trophy, defeating Valenciennes 3–0 to finally bring the Coupe de France home. The significance of this victory went far beyond the sporting realm as Alsace was then shaken by the Oradour-sur-Glane massacre investigation. Fourteen Alsatians, most of them forcibly incorporated in the Das Reich division, had been charged with war crimes, a move that aroused considerable resentment in the region. Immediately after their return in Strasbourg, the players held a symbolical and emotional ceremony at the city's monument to the deaths.

Only one year later, Strasbourg was relegated following the worst ever season in the club's history. They were however back in the top flight after only one season in Division 2. In 1954–55, thanks to the arrival of Austrian star Ernst Stojaspal, Strasbourg had one of its best championship seasons in the post-war era, eventually ending with the 4th place. The club, however, was unable to build on this success and was relegated to Division 2 in 1957 and 1960, each time gaining immediate promotion back to the top flight.  During the 1960s, the club was able to participate in the Inter-Cities Fairs Cup thanks to the city's Foire européenne. In 1964–65 under Paul Frantz's guidance, Racing ousted giants Milan and Barcelona before falling in the quarter-finals against Manchester United. A year later, they repeated as cup winners beating champions Nantes in final by the score of 1–0. On this occasion, captain René Hauss accomplished the remarkable feat of winning two cups with the same club with a 15 years-interval. Other key team members during this era included Raymond Kaelbel and young talents Gilbert Gress and Gérard Hausser. Again, Racing's triumph in the cup was not without controversy, reporter Thierry Roland said on live TV that "the cup [was] leaving France", a comment that was deemed offensive by many in Alsace.

In 1968, Racing started a process that would eventually lead to a merger with two other clubs, the "Association Sportive Culturelle de la Meinau" and, most importantly, the CS des Pierrots 1922 Strasbourg. The merger was effective in 1970 and the new entity was named "Le Racing Pierrots Strasbourg Meinau", or RPSM. The Pierrots were then a very successful amateur team – they won the national amateur championship in 1969 and 1970—but lacked sufficient structures to jump to professional play while Racing was more wealthy but in search for talent. The merger thus appeared as an excellent opportunity to build a powerful football club in Strasbourg and was favoured by business and political circles. However, the wedding was a difficult one with many internal struggles that were evidenced when some of the former Pierrots left the new entity as soon as 1971 to re-found their former club. That same year, the RPSM was relegated despite the arrival at the end of the season of Yugoslavian star Ivica Osim. As usual, Strasbourg then won immediate promotion with Osim and two French internationals in its ranks: Jean-Noël Huck and Marc Molitor. Back in division 1 in 1972, the club made one of the biggest transfer blunders in its history: Osim was sent to Sedan to leave a foreign player spot for Reinhard Libuda. The Yugoslavian left Strasbourg in tears but helped Sedan to decent results while Libuda was quickly suspended due to a match fixing scandal in Germany and eventually released in March 1973. In 1976, the club was again relegated and went back to its old identity as Racing Club de Strasbourg, reflecting the final failure of the RPSM merger.

Glorious years (1976–1980)
In 1976, the future seemed somewhat dark for Racing: the club had been relegated for the second time in only four years, was torn apart by internal struggles following the failure of the merger and was desperately seeking municipal subventions to reach a balanced budget. Financial difficulties meant that Racing was unable to retain or replace its best players (Huck, Molitor, Gress, Hausser, Spiegel) who left for other clubs or retired. This impossibility to buy on the transfer market meant that, for the first time, Strasbourg had to rely essentially on players out of its youth academy and local amateur clubs. Fortunately for the club, the mid-1970s saw the emergence of a very talented generation of youngsters consisting mainly of Léonard Specht, Jean-Jacques Marx, René Deutschmann, Yves Ehrlacher, Albert Gemmrich, Roland Wagner and Joël Tanter. Along with goalkeeper Dominique Dropsy and captain Jacky Duguépéroux, these players formed the backbone of the team for the superb 1976–1980 period. During these four years, Racing won two championships (D2 in 1977 and D1 in 1979), reached very honourable league rankings the two other years (third in 1978, fifth in 1980) and had its best results ever in European play (UEFA Cup round of sixteen in 1979, European Cup quarter finals in 1980).

The start of the 1976–77 season was nevertheless difficult. In November, after a defeat at Amiens, Racing called Elek Schwartz out of retirement to help and supervise the work of player-manager Heinz Schilcher. Schwartz was an important player of the 1930s team and had a renowned international coaching career behind him, especially with spells at the Netherlands national team and Benfica. Under his guidance, the team quickly improved, earning promotion to Division 1 and defeating Monaco for the Division 2 championship title, the first one in the club's history. After accomplishing his mission, Schwartz definitely retired and was replaced by Gilbert Gress. As a player, Gress had achieved iconic status with Racing supporters. A child of the Neudorf, he was a genial player with a strong personality, the first Frenchman to shine in the neighbouring Bundesliga with VfB Stuttgart. His second return to Strasbourg, after a first comeback as a player, was greeted with enthusiasm and his charisma aroused a strong public interest for the team's performances, with attendance rates at an all-time high.

The 1977–78 season saw the peculiar dominance of the two promoted sides with Monaco going on to win the championship and Strasbourg reaching an unexpected third place, the best ranking since 1936. Gress printed his mark on the team right away, insisting on the recruitment of experienced, hard-working players (Jacky Novi, Raymond Domenech, Francis Piasecki) instead of foreign stars and putting into practice innovative tactical ideas. A self-proclaimed admirer of Ajax's Total Football, Gress wanted all his players to both defend and attack and asked for great versatility. This was rather unusual in French football at that time. In most French clubs, defenders were told not to cross the midfield line and strikers had almost no defensive duties. To the contrary, Gress instructed his forwards to exert immediate pressure on the other's side defenders and encouraged offensive initiatives by his own backs. A sign of versatility was the fact the side's top-scorer during that era, Albert Gemmrich, played on the left wing despite being right-footed. Gemmrich developed an ability to score with both feet after an injury that forced him to train using only his left foot and Gress used his peculiar profile to puzzle defences, with great success.

For the 1978–79 season, Racing kept essentially the same team that had won promotion in 1977 and a third place in 1978. The only exceptions were the addition of midfielder Roger Jouve and the exchange between striker Jacques Vergnes and Chadian player Nabatingue Toko. A French international, Vergnes clashed with Gress due to his unwillingness to assume defensive duties and his vocal frustration after being regularly sidelined. He was quickly sent to Bordeaux six games after the start the season. His replacement, Tonko, was the only foreign player on the squad that year, a fact that again was unusual since French club football was at that time still very dependent on the qualities of players from abroad. Strasbourg took the lead early in the season and did not give it back until the end in spite of widespread scepticism from national followers. The absence of big names in the team was considered by many to be a crippling handicap against established teams like Saint-Étienne or Nantes which had internationally renowned players. For his part, Gress used the critical review of the press to boost his player's motivation and insisted that "the star is the team". Racing finished atop the championship on 56 points with an undefeated home record. The return from Lyon, where the title game was played, was triumphant with huge crowds greeting the team at every railway station in Alsace before the arrival of the train at Strasbourg.

The club saw same movement during the 1979 inter-season. Chairman Alain Léopold was replaced by the influential André Bord, Duguépéroux ended his pro career and Gemmrich left for Bordeaux. To replace him, Bord imposed the recruitment of Carlos Bianchi to Gress. Bianchi was a prolific goalscorer but he was also a very traditional striker with no intention to commit to defence and teamplay, to Gress' despair. The season was marked by the return of internal struggles, especially with the increasingly confrontational relationship between Gress and Bord, but the team nevertheless achieved a fifth-place finish and advanced to the quarter-finals of the European Cup, where it was eliminated by Ajax (0–0;0–4).

Chronic instability (since 1980)
The Bleus did not enjoy their success for long. In September 1980, Gress was controversially sacked and, after several seasons of middling results, Racing was returned to second-tier play in 1986. For the first time, Strasbourg failed to win immediate promotion back to the first tier, eventually ending 9th place in its group, the worst ranking ever for the club. Success however came back with the 1987–88 season as new manager Henryk Kasperczak led Racing to its second Division 2 title with players like Juan Simón, Peter Reichert and the returning Léonard Specht. Strasbourg, however, was unable to preserve its spot in the top-flight and was back in Division 2 in 1989. With Specht now a manager, Racing failed to secure promotion for the next two seasons, each time falling in the playoffs, first against Nice and then again Lens. In 1991–92, Gress came back to his hometown as manager and, after defeating Rennes (0–0; 4–1) in the final promotion playoff match, Strasbourg made a lasting return to the top flight. The 1992–93 season saw the club finish in eighth place, a ranking that has not been equalled since, allowing the likes of José Cobos, Frank Leboeuf and Marc Keller to shine in the top flight. At the end of the 1993–94 season, Gress left Racing due to personal disagreements with the club's direction. He was replaced by Daniel Jeandupeux who was himself fired after eight months. Jacky Duguépéroux then took over the club and led it to its most brilliant period since the 1979 title.  During the 1990s, there was a mounting interest for football in France with the rise of the national team and, like other clubs, Racing benefited from this context. The club was then able to attract French major players like Franck Sauzée and foreign stars like Aleksandr Mostovoi. With this mix of established players and rising prospects, the team reached the final of the cup in 1995, losing to Paris Saint-Germain (0–1). In April that same year, Strasbourg became the only team to defeat champions Nantes, 2–0 at la Meinau. After successfully going through the 1995 Intertoto Cup during the summer, Racing was able to participate in the UEFA Cup where they reached the second round, losing to Italian giants AC Milan.

In 1996, the Bosman ruling entered into force and made it difficult for French clubs to retain their best players. Strasbourg was no exception. During the summer, the team lost Mostovoi and its two French internationals, Marc Keller and Frank Leboeuf. Despite these departures, Racing fared well in the league, staying most of the season in the top 5 before ultimately settling for a 9th-place finish. That same year, the IMG–McCormack Group was chosen by the municipality to take control of the club. The players, still trained by Jacky Duguépéroux, went on to capture the Coupe de la Ligue – the first national trophy in 18 years – by defeating Bordeaux in a penalty shootout. A good UEFA Cup run followed that victory, allowing young players formed at the club like Olivier Dacourt or Valérien Ismaël to shine in continental play. After a successful qualification round against Rangers and Liverpool, Strasbourg defeated Inter Milan 2–0 at la Meinau, but fell 0–3 in the away leg.

In the meantime, IMG had taken over the club in the summer of 1997 and Patrick Proisy, former tennis player and head of the French branch, became president. He was joined a year later by his friend Claude Le Roy as manager. The Proisy–Le Roy period at Racing was a troubled one with poor results, several scandals and a general disillusionment of the fans towards the club's management. Several suspicious transfers during that period have led Strasbourg's prosecutor to indict Proisy and Le Roy of misuse of company assets and forgery in 2006. During their reign, the club sold all of its best prospects and essentially replaced them with disappointing, expensive foreign players such as Diego Hector Garay, Gonzalo Belloso and Mario Haas. In 2000–01, the club accomplished the paradoxical feat of being relegated after spending the whole season in the bottom three while winning the French cup with a victory on penalties against Amiens. On that occasion, Paraguayan star José Luis Chilavert scored the winning penalty for Strasbourg at the Stade de France.

In 2001–02, the club, led by manager Ivan Hašek, immediately re-took its place among the country's football elite by finishing runners-up in Ligue 2. The year 2003 saw the departure of IMG and Proisy. The club was taken over by a pool of local investors with former player Marc Keller staying as director-general. The new ownership focused on cleaning up the club's finances. In 2005, Racing won their second domestic trophy in four years when they beat Caen 2–1 in the final of the League Cup, a feat which provided them with a passport to the 2005–06 UEFA Cup, in which they reached the last sixteen.

In 2006, Strasbourg was again relegated. The club was taken over by real estate investor Philippe Ginestet and celebrated its centennial in the autumn of 2006 with various events, including an exhibition and a friendly match against Marseille. Ginestet hired French legend Jean-Pierre Papin as the new manager and the club again won immediate promotion to the top flight in 2007, finishing at third place. In spite of this, Papin resigned as manager, citing internal relationship problems, and was succeeded by Jean-Marc Furlan. Under Furlan, the RCS was unable to preserve its spot in Ligue 1, mainly due to eleven consecutive defeats at the end of the 2007–08 season, a record for post-World War II football in France. Furlan was nevertheless confirmed as manager for the following Ligue 2 season but failed in his mission to bring the club back in the top-tier as Racing ended 4th with a huge defeat at Montpellier. Furlan's contract was subsequently terminated and Phillipe Ginestet stepped down from his position as chairman while remaining the major shareholder. He was succeeded by Léonard Specht, who picked Gilbert Gress as manager. However, Gress quickly entered in conflict with many members of the club, including Ginestet, whom he violently attacked just after his side's defeat to Châteauroux in the inaugural league game. Ginestet then convened an extraordinary meeting of the board to sack Gress, prompting Léonard Specht's resignation. Gress was replaced by assistant manager Pascal Janin, first as a caretaker and then as permanent manager, when Ginestet re-took the club's presidency at the end of August 2009. In the 2009–10 season, a final-day away defeat relegated Strasbourg to the Championnat National as they suffered their second relegation in three seasons. The 2010–11 season saw them narrowly miss out on promotion back to Ligue 2 as they finished fourth behind Guingamp.

On 17 July 2011, Racing Club de Strasbourg entered total liquidation and were removed from the National in favour of AS Cherbourg. On 25 August 2011, after lengthy negotiations with the FFF, Strasbourg were eventually reinstated into the fifth tier of the French footballing, the CFA 2, Group C. Strasbourg finished with 100 points to win promotion to the CFA, the fourth tier of French Football, during their first attempt in the 2011–12 season.

In 2012, the club was renamed RC Strasbourg Alsace with a corresponding new badge.

Strasbourg finished as champions of the CFA at the end of the 2012–13 season and returned to the National. In 2014, Jacky Duguépéroux was given the role of manager for the third time. He replaced François Keller, who, with three years of service, was their longest-serving manager since Gilbert Gress in the early-to-mid-1990s.

Return to the professional leagues

On 27 May 2016, Strasbourg drew 0–0 at Belfort to become champions of the National and clinch promotion to Ligue 2, marking their return to the professional level of the French football pyramid after a six-year absence.

On 19 May 2017, Strasbourg sealed its return to Ligue 1 after a nine-year absence from the French top tier following a 2–1 home victory over Bourg-Péronnas to claim the 2016-17 Ligue 2 championship.  On 2 December 2017, Strasbourg claimed a remarkable victory over Paris Saint-Germain winning 2–1.  This was the first defeat for PSG of the season as they had gone unbeaten in Ligue 1 and in the Champions League. At the end of the 2017/2018 Ligue 1 season, Strasbourg finished 15th on the table securing their survival in the top flight for the next campaign.

On 30 March 2019, Strasbourg won their fourth Coupe de la Ligue title by beating Guingamp 4 – 1 on penalties following a 0 – 0 draw after extra time. Strasbourg had reached their fourth ever final by beating Lille in the third round, followed by beating Marseille, Lyon and Bordeaux in the round of 16, quarter final and semi final respectively. The final was played at Lille’s Stade Pierre-Mauroy. Strasbourg’s goalkeeper Bingourou Kamara was named the Man Of The Match.

In the 2020–21 Ligue 1 season, Strasbourg struggled for most of the campaign but managed to finish 15th on the table. The following summer, Strasbourg hired Julien Stéphan, who had led Stade Rennais to their first major trophy in decades. During Stephan's first season in charge, Strasbourg contested for European qualification spots and finished sixth at the end of the year.

Colours and crest

While the colours of the town are red and white, Racing has always played in a combination of blue and white. The exact origin of this choice of colours is unknown. Over the years, the most common uniform has been composed of a medium blue jersey, white shorts and medium blue socks. During the last ten years, however, the team has regularly switched between medium blue, dark blue, sky blue and white as the main colour of its home jersey. Since 2007, the Flag of Alsace is featured on the back of the club's shirt. Hummel is the current kit designer. Previously (1973–2000; 2004–2007), Racing was equipped by Adidas, which has its French seat in Landersheim, between Strasbourg and Saverne. ASICS also supplied the club (2000–03).

The current team crest has been in use – with interruptions – since 1976 and is generally considered as the most legitimate one. It includes a stylised stork (symbol of Alsace), a red diagonal stripe from the city's coat of arms and a depiction of the Cathedral along with the club's initials: RCS. Between 1997 and 2006, the club used another logo, introduced by Patrick Proisy. This crest was then considered to be more "modern" and was supposed to depict at the same time the Cathedral and a stork. The resemblance, however, was far from being obvious to everyone and the design was quickly derogatively nicknamed "Pac-Man" due to some common traits with the famous video game. In 2006, the new management of the club, acceding to a supporter demand, re-installed the 1976 crest.

Stadium
Racing have been playing at the Stade de la Meinau in southern Strasbourg since 1914. The stadium hosted the 1938 World Cup and Euro 1984. Its maximum capacity was downsized from 45,000 to 29,000 during the 1990s to meet new safety standards.

Supporters and rivalries
Historically, Racing has its roots in southern Strasbourg in the working-class Neudorf, Meinau and Polygone neighbourhoods. In the 1930s, the team was the only one in the area to jump to professional play and, with the help of good results during that decade, it built support all around the town. In Strasbourg like in the rest of France, there is only one pro football club in every city and hence no in-town rivalry, a fact that heavily contrasts with the situation in Great Britain, Italy or Spain. Nowadays, as the only professional football club in Alsace, Racing attracts a large fan base that covers both the Bas-Rhin and Haut-Rhin départements as well as the eastern part of the Moselle. The fan-base outside of this area is essentially limited to people that, for a reason or another, have a personal link with Alsace. The club also has ties to the other side of the Rhine, especially through a supporter friendship with Karlsruher SC and regular friendly matches during the summer.

On average, the attendance in Ligue 1 has been around 20,000 for a stadium capacity of 29,000. Supporters groups include the "Ultra Boys 90", the "Kop Ciel et Blanc" and the "Club central des supporters". Most of the supporter groups and the most vocal fans in general have elected location in the Kop at the "Quart de Virage Nord-Ouest" (North-West quarter corner). Strasbourg supporters have the reputation to be faithful yet critical. Former captain Corentin Martins has once asserted that the Strasbourg public is "demanding, but fair".  Racing is always an emotional topic in Alsace. It is often said that some may love it or hate it, or even both at the same time, but that it leaves no one indifferent.

Racing Strasbourg's main rival is Metz. The clubs compete is what is generally referred as the "Derby de l'Est" ("the Eastern derby") in France, a rather inappropriate term since the two cities are 150 kilometres apart. There is however a significant degree of inter-regional rivalry between Alsace and Lorraine, leading to some acrimony between the fans on both sides. The two clubs met each other in the quarter-finals of the 1995 UEFA Intertoto Cup in what was the first ever match between two French teams in a European competition. Strasbourg won the game 2–0. When Mulhouse was professional, the two sides also nourished a rivalry that persists as far as youth teams are concerned.

Ownership and chairmanship

Overview
Racing's history has always been closely intertwined with local business and politics. In the 1930s, the club's jump to professionalism was sustained by car manufacturer Emile Mathis who had his factory just in front of the stade de la Meinau. RCS quickly entered a rivalry with Sochaux, a team that was backed by Mathis' competitor Peugeot. After WW2, Mathis ceased activity and the club had to find other sponsors including the Crédit Mutuel – a large banking institution that has its roots in Alsace and appeared on the club's shirt throughout most of the 1960s and 1970s – as well as the town's municipality. In 1980, André Bord, a prominent local Gaullist politician and former minister during the Charles de Gaulle and Georges Pompidou presidencies, became chairman. Bord could boast his connections in business, political and artistic elites and vowed to make Racing a big name in French football. However, he quickly entered a confrontation with charismatic manager Gilbert Gress that culminated in September 1980 when the announcement of Gress' departure provoked crowd anger and riots scenes during a game against Nantes. The inability for the influential president and the talented manager to get along with each other and the 1980 trauma may explain why Racing was unable to perform lastingly at the top level after the 1979 title.

In 1986, Bord left the professional section and introduced fashion designer Daniel Hechter as his successor. Hechter had previously been banned from pro football following his involvement in the Paris Saint-Germain secret funds scandal but was nevertheless able to re-take a president job at Strasbourg thanks to a sentence reduction. It was the first attempt to bring an outsider to the local context at the club's head, but the experiment ended in failure in 1990 as the club neared bankruptcy. Racing was at that time salvaged by the Strasbourg municipality which took a 49% share of the club but had to relinquish it a few years later as the Pasqua legislation restricted public support to professional sport. In 1997, two projects were competing to buy the municipal share and effectively take control of the club. The first was led by then-president Roland Weller, a local businessman. The second bid was made by American IMG-McCormack Group through its French branch headed by Patrick Proisy. At that time, IMG was trying to develop its activities in European football and had failed the previous year in its effort to buy Olympique de Marseille. The American group presented an ambitious project with an entirely new youth academy as well as plans for a renovated stadium, eventually winning the competition for Racing's ownership for a price of 1.5 million euros. The club became a "Société Anonyme à Objet Sportif" and then a "Société Anonyme Sportive Professionnelle", a status very similar to the general corporate status, albeit with restrictions like the impossibility to enter the stock market and the obligation to keep ties with the original association. Proisy became the chairman of the board with full control over the professional section but not the omni-sport structure that still possessed the club's name and its affiliation to the French Football Federation (FFF). This was evidenced in 2002 when Proisy and Bord, still a chairman of the omni-sport, entered a dispute that led to the inability for the pro players to wear the name "Racing club de Strasbourg" on their jerseys for some time.

Proisy's reign at Strasbourg was fraught with misunderstandings, frustration and poor results on the pitch. The Alsatian public especially resented the fact that Proisy was unwilling to settle in Strasbourg, instead controlling the club's destiny from IMG's offices in Paris. Racing's troubles as well as the town's refusal to finance an extension of the stade de la Meinau to host the 1998 FIFA World Cup provoked heated debate during the 2001 municipal election and eventually became part of the elements that drove to the defeat of Catherine Trautmann. In 2003, the club was bought back by a pool of local investors including Egon Gindorf who became chairman, Patrick Adler, Pierre Schmidt and Philippe Ginestet who all had been club sponsors during the IMG era. The new ownership bought the club for a symbolical euro to an IMG group eager to cut its losses after the death of Mark McCormack but had to cover a 3 million euro deficit to close the 2002–03 budget. It is estimated that Racing lost 15 million euros during the IMG era, mainly due to a dubious recruitment policy.

Thanks to a prudent transfer policy initiated by director Marc Keller and good attendance rates, the new management was able to redress finances but the club's economic situation has remained fragile up to now. In 2004, Gindorf experienced personal and financial difficulties and was willing to scale down his involvement at Racing. It was understood that Philippe Ginestet would become the new chairman at the end of the 2004–05 season. However, this move was opposed by Keller who, in June 2005, clearly announced that he would not work with Ginestet. Keller had in fact been acting as the club's head since 2002 but was only a minor shareholder. He nevertheless was able to mobilise his iconic status with supporters to, at first, block Ginestet's accession to chairmanship, provoking a deadlock that lasted throughout 2005 as the club was looking for an investor. In the fall of 2005, it was announced that Alain Afflelou, owner of the biggest optician in France and a former president of Bordeaux, would be the new owner, but he was eventually out-bid by Ginestet who took control of the club midway through the 2005–06 season, forcing Keller's departure a few months later. Ginestet held a majority share during four years, which he sold in the end of 2009 for a price of €1.6 million. After some speculation, the new owner was identified as Alain Fontenla, a French investment broker based in London. In 2010, Fontenla owned 85%, along with Carousel Finance (15%) a holding named "Racing investissements", which itself owned a majority share (70%) of EuroRacing, the main shareholder (78%) of the club. The other major shareholder of the club was Lohr SA, an industrial group centred on transportation activities.

Presidential history
Below is a list of RC Strasbourg's 15 presidents since the start of the professional era in 1933. The president has not always been the real owner of the club. For example, between 1990 and 1997 the municipality was the major shareholder, but it chose to delegate the chairmanships to independent local entrepreneurs.

The 2009–10 season saw a record of five successive presidents. Early into the season, Léonard Specht stepped down from his position, after the sacking of Glibert Gress, whom he had appointed as manager. Philippe Ginestet then re-took the presidency, but left the club when the takeover by the new owners was completed in December. The new owners chose to name Julien Fournier as the new Chief executive but, after some turmoil, Fournier quickly entered a dispute with the new major shareholder, Alain Fontenla. Fournier's contract was terminated in February and he was replaced by Luc Dayan on an interim basis. Only a month later, former Sochaux chairman Jean-Claude Plessis came to replace Dayan.

Players

Current squad

Out on loan

Strasbourg B

Walid Hasbi

Former players

RCS does not have an official hall of fame or an all-time XI. Various selections have been made by press and supporters but none has achieved universal respect. 21 players have been capped for France while playing for Strasbourg. The most notable one is Oscar Heisserer who played a record 18 times with the national team while at Strasbourg and was the first Alsatian and first and only RCS player to wear the armband for France. Dominique Dropsy, Léonard Specht and Gérard Hausser also earned more than 10 caps while Marc Molitor is one of the rare examples of a player being capped for the national team while playing in the Division 2. Unsurprisingly, it is during the 1978–1979 title season that Racing had the most players included in the national squad. On 7 October 1978 were a record four RCS players (Dominique Dropsy, Roger Jouve, Francis Piasecki, Albert Gemmrich) on the field for a Euro 1980 qualifying game against Luxembourg. This figure was repeated a month later for a friendly against Spain (Dropsy, Piasecki, Gemmrich and Léonard Specht). Frank Leboeuf and Marc Keller were the last RCS players to earn a cap during the 1995–1996 season. Leboeuf is one of the two former RCS in the French team that won World Cup, the other one being Youri Djorkaeff.

Players to have once played for Strasbourg to have recently played for France include Olivier Dacourt and Richard Dutruel, (both in 2004). Furthermore, current France international midfielder Morgan Schneiderlin is a product of RC Strasbourg's Youth set-up, spending 13 years with the club before moving to Southampton after just five first-team appearances for Strasbourg. Schneiderlin then moved to Manchester United on 14 July 2015 before a move to Everton in January 2017.

With regional feelings still strong in Alsace, the performances of local players logically attract special attention. Seven out of the ten players with the most apparitions for Racing are from Alsace:  René Hauss (who holds the record), Léonard Specht, René Deutschmann, Edmond Haan, Gérard Hausser, Jean Schuth and Raymond Kaelbel.  Since 1979, there is also a peculiar tradition that every Racing team to win a trophy or reach a final featured a Breton as captain, manager or both. Jacky Duguépéroux captained the 1979 team and won the Coupe de la Ligue in 1997 and 2005 as a manager. The 2001 Coupe de France winning team for itself included Yvon Pouliquen as manager and Corentin Martins as captain. Pouliquen also was the captain for the 1995 final.

Apart from French internationals and Alsatians, there is a strong tradition to have foreign players from Central and Eastern Europe at Strasbourg. The successful Racing team of the 1930s regularly included Austrians both as players and coaches, a tradition that was continued when Ernst Stojaspal played at la Meinau in the 1950s. Other Mitteleuropa players fondly remembered include Elek Schwartz, Ivica Osim, Ivan Hašek, Alexander Vencel or Danijel Ljuboja while Russian Aleksandr Mostovoi is the last world-class star to play for Racing to this date. Also, one of the greatest goalkeepers of all times, the Paraguayan José Luis Chilavert who, known for being three times selected IFFHS World's Best Goalkeeper and his free-kick abilities, won the 2001 Coupe de France with the club.

Managers

Strasbourg has had 47 managers in the professional era, with the holder of the office changing 57 times. This is a record in French football only surpassed by Marseille. Gilbert Gress holds the record for the longest-serving manager at the club, both for a single spell (39 months between. 1977–80, 152 matches) and overall (75 months in three spells, 275 matches). Paul Frantz holds the record for the most spells at Racing with four (73 months overall, 227 matches). Jacky Duguépéroux is the only manager to win two trophies with the club.

Current coaching staff

Honours

League
Ligue 1
Winners: 1978–79
Ligue 2
Winners: 1976–77, 1987–88, 2016–17
Championnat National
Winners: 2015–16
Championnat National 2
Winners: 2012–13
Alsace Champions
Winners: 1923, 1924, 1926
Dordogne Champions
Winners: 1940

Cups
Coupe de France
Winners: 1950–51, 1965–66, 2000–01
Coupe de la Ligue
Winners: 1963–64, 1996–97, 2004–05, 2018–19

Europe
UEFA Intertoto Cup
Winners: 1995

Records
Biggest victory: 10–0 (vs. Valenciennes, 1937–38)
Biggest defeat: 0–8 (vs. Limoges, 1959–60)
Biggest victory in European game: 5–0 (v. Grazer AK, 2005–06)
Biggest defeat in European game: 2–10 (v. MTK Budapest, 1961–62)
Record appearances: René Hauss (580; 421 in Ligue 1; between 1949 and 1969)
Most consecutive appearances for the club: Dominique Dropsy (336; between 1973 and 1982)
Most goals for the club: Oskar Rohr (118; between 1934 and 1939)
Most goals for a single championship season at the club: Oskar Rohr (30; 1936–37)
 Oldest player: René Hauss (39 years, 351 days; vs. Nantes; 11 December 1966)
 Youngest player: Jacques Glassmann (16 years, 95 days vs. Nantes, 25 November 1978)
Record attendance: 39,033, 20 November 1992, vs. Marseille
Highest transfer fee paid: €5.3 million (to Sturm Graz for Mario Haas in 1999)
Highest transfer fee received: €8.8 million (from Lyon for Peguy Luyindula in 2001)

References

Bibliography
 Pierre Perny, Racing 100 ans, 2006, 350 p.
 Ronald Hirlé, Il était une fois le Racing, Toute l'histoire du club omnisport Strasbourgeois, 1991, 176 p.

External links

Official website 
Club profile at French league
Independent website  
Racing Club de Strasbourg Football 
RC Strasbourg Archive

 
Football clubs in France
Football clubs from former German territories
Football clubs in Strasbourg
Association football clubs established in 1906
1906 establishments in Germany
S
Ligue 1 clubs